Spilarctia baltazarae is a moth in the family Erebidae. It was described by Karel Černý in 1995. It is found in the Philippines.

References

Moths described in 1995
baltazarae